Sisimba is an administrative ward in the Mbeya Urban district of the Mbeya Region of Tanzania. In 2016 the Tanzania National Bureau of Statistics report there were 4,532 people in the ward, from 4,112 in 2012.

The Sokoine Stadium is located within the Sisimba ward.

Neighborhoods 
The ward has 6 neighborhoods.
 Jakaranda A
 Jakaranda B
 Soko Kuu
 TANESCO
 Uzunguni A
 Uzunguni B

References 

Wards of Mbeya Region